St. James Catholic Church, or variations including and Cemetery or other, may refer to:

in the United States (by state then city):
St. James Catholic Church (Savannah, Georgia)
St. James Catholic Church and Cemetery (Lemont, Illinois), listed on the National Register of Historic Places (NRHP) in Cook County, Illinois
St. James' Catholic Church (Louisville, Kentucky), NRHP-listed
St. James Roman Catholic Church (Crosstown, Missouri)
St. James Catholic Church (Woodbridge, New Jersey)
St. James' Roman Catholic Church (Manhattan), New York
St. James Catholic Church (Jamestown, North Dakota), listed on the NRHP in North Dakota
Proto-Cathedral of St. James the Greater, Vancouver, Washington; known as St. James Catholic Church until 2013
St. James Catholic Church and Cemetery (Menomonee Falls, Wisconsin), a historic church found eligible for listing on the National Register of Historic Places in Waukesha County
St. James Roman Catholic Church (Lakewood, Ohio)

See also
St. James' Church (disambiguation)
St. James Episcopal Church (disambiguation)